Europa-Schule Kairo (ESK) is a German international school in New Cairo, Cairo Governorate, Egypt.

It serves students until Gymnasium Sekundarstufe II.

It is recognized as a German school abroad by the Central Agency for German Schools Abroad (ZfA).

References

External links
 Europa-Schule Kairo 

International schools in Greater Cairo
German international schools in Egypt
Schools in New Cairo